is a railway station on the Kagoshima Main Line, operated by Kyushu Railway Company in Shingū, Fukuoka Prefecture, Japan.

Lines

Layout
The station consists of two opposed side platforms serving two tracks.

Adjacent stations

History
The station was opened by JR Kyushu on 13 March 2010 as an added station on the existing Kagoshima Main Line track.

Passenger statistics
In fiscal 2016, the station was used by an average of 4,878 passengers daily (boarding passengers only), and it ranked 42nd among the busiest stations of JR Kyushu.

See also 
List of railway stations in Japan

References

External links
Shingū-Chūō (JR Kyushu)

Railway stations in Fukuoka Prefecture
Railway stations in Japan opened in 2010